Robyn Erbesfield-Raboutou (born 8 August 1963), is an American rock climber and rock climbing coach. She is a 4-time World Cup champion (1992, 1993, 1994, 1995), and won the biennial World Championships in 1995.  She is the third-ever woman in history to climb a  graded sport climbing route. She has coached several competition climbers, including Megan Mascarenas, Margo Hayes and her daughter, Brooke Raboutou.

Climbing career
Erbesfield won the world's first Climbing World Cup (Leeds in 1989) as a relative unknown. She quickly gained sponsorship and traveled around the world to compete on the new world cup circuit. She went on to win the overall title for four consecutive World Cups from 1992 to 1995.

Coaching career
She founded the climbing gym ABC Kids Climbing in Boulder, Colorado which focuses on developing agility, balance, and coordination in young climbers. Many of its graduates are climbing 5.14, and performing well in national and international climbing competitions. Two of the four American athletes who qualified for the 2020 Olympics in sport climbing, Brooke Raboutou and Colin Duffy, were both members of Team ABC, which also produced Margo Hayes, the first woman to climb a  route, and Natalia Grossman, the 2021 bouldering world champion.

In 2018 she was inducted into the Boulder Sports Hall of fame.

Personal life

Rankings

Climbing World Cup

Climbing World Championships

Number of medals in the Climbing World Cup

Lead

Notable Climbs

Redpointed 
:
 Welcome to Tijuana - Rodellar (ESP) - July 2012 - Her first 8c, at age 49 becoming the oldest American to climb the grade

:
 Ixeia - Rodellar (ESP) - June 2012
 Tripa de Conejo - Rodellar (ESP) - June 2012
 God's Own Stone - Red River Gorge (USA) - April 1, 2012 - At age 48
 Bad Attitude - Saint-Antonin-Noble-Val (FRA) - August 27, 2008 - At age 45
 Attention vos Regards - Saint-Antonin-Noble-Val (FRA) - 1993
 Silence Vertical - Troubat (FRA) - 1993 - World's third-ever female ascent of an 8b+ route.

On-sighted 
:
 Overdose - Lourmarin (FRA) - 1993 - World's first-ever female onsight of an 8a/+ route.

:
 Ramponeau - Saint-Antonin-Noble-Val (FRA) - 1992

Bibliography

See also
History of rock climbing

References

External links 

American rock climbers
Female climbers
Living people
American sportswomen
1963 births
21st-century American women
IFSC Climbing World Championships medalists
IFSC Climbing World Cup overall medalists